The 2012–13 season was the Wellington Phoenix's sixth season in the A-League. Many pegged the club to be a strong contender in the 2012–13 season, but the Phoenix finished in last place with points equal to Melbourne Heart, but with an inferior goal difference.

Players

First-team squad

Reserve squad
Football School of Excellence players

Contract extensions

Transfers

In

 Brackets round club names indicate the player's contract with that club had expired before he joined Wellington Phoenix.

Out

 Brackets round a club denote the player joined that club after his Wellington Phoenix contract expired.

Loans in

Loans out

Matches

2012–13 Pre-season friendlies

2012–13 A-League fixtures

Notes

Results by round

League table

Statistics

Appearances

*Left the field after succumbing to a head injury

Goal scorers

Goal assists

Discipline

Goal times

Home attendance

Club

Technical staff
First team Coach:  Ricki Herbert (until 26 February 2013)
Assistant coach :  Chris Greenacre
Strength & conditioning coach:  Ed Baranowski
Goalkeeping coach:  Jonathan Gould
Physiotherapist: Wayne Roberts
Masseur: Dene Carroll

Kit

End of season Awards
See also List of Wellington Phoenix FC End of Season Awards
Sony Player of the Year: Andrew Durante
Players' Player of the Year: Jeremy Brockie
Under-23 Player of the Year: Louis Fenton
Golden Boot: Jeremy Brockie – 16 goals
Lloyd Morrison Spirit of the Phoenix Award: Ben Sigmund

References

External links

2012-13
2012–13 in New Zealand association football
2012–13 A-League season by team